Ebenhausen (Unterfr) station is a railway station in Ebenhausen, Bavaria, Germany.

References

Railway stations in Bavaria
Buildings and structures in Bad Kissingen (district)
Railway stations in Germany opened in 1871
1871 establishments in Bavaria